The men's beach volleyball tournament at the 2012 Olympic Games in London, United Kingdom, took place between 28 July and 9 August at Horse Guards Parade.

Twenty-four pairs were competing, including one from Great Britain as the host country, and a maximum of two from each nation. Sixteen qualified through positioning in the FIVB Beach Volleyball World Rankings as of 17 June 2012, five others earned their places at the 2010–12 Continental Beach Volleyball Cup, and the final three from the FIVB Beach Volleyball World Cup Olympic Qualification tournament.

Seeds

Preliminary round

The composition of the preliminary rounds was announced confirmed on 19 July 2012 in a draw held in Klagenfurt, Austria.

Teams are awarded two points for a win and one for a loss. If two teams are tied at the end of pool play, the tiebreakers is their head-to-head match. If two teams are tied at the end of pool play, the tiebreakers is their head-to-head match. If three or more teams are tied, the tiebreakers are (1) points ratio between tied teams, (2) points ratio within pool, and (3) tournament seed. The two best teams from each group directly advance to the round-of-16. The two best 3rd-placed teams also advance. The remaining four third-placed teams play one another in two Lucky Loser matches, and the two winners complete the list of 16 playoff teams.

All times are British Summer Time (UTC+01:00).

Pool A

|}

Pool B

|}

Pool C

|}

Pool D

|}

Pool E

|}

Pool F

|}

Lucky loser

Of the 6 teams that are placed third in their pools, two directly qualify for the playoffs. From the four remaining third placed teams, another two teams qualify for the playoffs by winning a Lucky Loser match.

This table shows the results of the third placed teams after the pool play, and before the Lucky Loser matches.

|}

Lucky loser play-offs

Playoffs

Round of 16

Finals overview

Quarter-finals

Semi-finals

Bronze medal match

Final

Final ranking

See also
Beach volleyball at the 2012 Summer Olympics – Women's tournament

References

External links
Official website of the 2012 Olympic beach volleyball tournaments

Men's beach
2012 in beach volleyball
2012
Men's events at the 2012 Summer Olympics